Super TV is the first Bosnian IPTV provider, owned by Logosoft.

The service was launched on 11 March 2009 in Sarajevo. In January 2015, the company m: tel bought for 24 million BAM majority stake (65%) in Logosoft.

Super TV is Internet protocol television (IPTV), which is based on xDSL technology and provides a high degree of interactivity and personalization of television content. It provides various thematic channels, HD and timeshift channels, video on demand, video recording, the use of an electronic program guide (EPG) and other similar services. The company offers integrated packages (LoGo) with fixed telephony, mobile telephony, IPTV and Internet access.

Channel line-up
Customers of Super TV must purchase or rent an IPTV set-top box and subscribe to one of the ten TV packages: Nice Paket, Very Nice Paket, Great Paket, FilmBox Paket, Zadruga Paket, HBO Paket, Cinemax Paket or HBO Premium HD Paket.

Nice Paket
 1 – BHT 1 HD
 2 – BHT 1 SD
 3 – FTV HD
 4 – RTRS
 5 – RTRS PLUS
 6 – TVSA HD
 7 – OBN HD
 8 – TV Alfa
 9 – Pink BH
 10 – Nova BH HD
 11 – Face TV HD
 12 – Al Jazeera Balkans HD
 13 – Hayat TV HD
 14 – HAYAT Plus HD
 15 – O KANAL HD
 16 – RTV BN HD
 17 – OTV Valentino
 18 – Alternativna TV HD
 19 – RTV Vogošća HD
 20 – ELTA 1 HD
 21 – RTV Zenica HD
 22 – RTV TK
 23 – TV Slon HD
 24 – RTV 7 HD
 25 – Prva BH HD
 26 – RTVIS
 27 – RTV HB HD
 28 – K3
 29 – City TV
 30 – Kanal 6 HD
 31 – MTV Igman
 32 – Televizija 5 HD
 33 – BIR TV HD
 34 – Laudato TV HD
 35 – HRT 1 HD
 36 – HRT 2 HD
 37 – HRT 3 HD
 38 – HRT 4 HD
 39 – RTL Televizija HD
 40 – RTL 2 HR HD
 41 – RTL Kockica HD
 42 – RTL Living
 43 – RTS 1 HD
 44 – RTS 2 HD
 45 – RTS 3 HD
 46 – RTS Svet HD
 47 – RTS Drama
 48 – RTS Trezor
 49 – RTS Kolo
 50 – RTS Život
 51 – RTS Muzika
 52 – RTS Poletarac
 53 – RTS Klasika
 54 – Euronews Serbia HD
 55 – Bloomberg Adria HD
 56 – Blic TV HD
 57 – Kurir TV HD
 58 – Super Sat TV HD
 59 – Tanjug TV HD
 60 – K1 HD
 61 – K::CN Kopernikus 1
 62 – K::CN Music 2
 63 – K::CN Svet+ 3
 64 – Happy TV
 65 – B1 HD
 66 – TV1000
 67 – DIVA
 68 – FilmBox Stars
 69 – FilmBox Extra HD
 70 – TDC HD
 71 – Cinema TV
 72 – Klasik TV
 73 – Film Klub
 74 – SUPERSTAR TV HD
 75 – SUPERSTAR 2
 76 – AXN
 77 – AMC
 78 – Fox HD
 79 – Fox Movies HD
 80 – FOX Life HD
 81 – FOX Crime HD
 82 – Epic Drama HD
 83 – Sci Fi HD
 84 – Discovery Channel HD
 85 – Animal Planet HD
 86 – TLC Balkans HD
 87 – ID
 88 – History Channel
 89 – National Geographic HD
 90 – National Geographic Wild HD
 91 – Viasat Nature HD
 92 – Viasat History HD
 93 – Viasat Explorer HD
 94 – DOX TV
 95 – E! HD
 96 – TV DR HD
 97 –  24Kitchen HD
 98 – Kitchen TV HD
 99 – Agro TV HD
 100 – Travel Channel
 101 – Balkan Trip HD
 102 – Eko vizija HD
 103 – CBS Reality
 104 – NASA TV HD
 105 – Jim Jam
 106 – Baby TV
 107 – Minimax
 108 – Nickelodeon
 109 – Nickelodeon HD
 110 – Nick jr.
 111 – NickToons
 112 – Dečija TV
 113 – Dexy TV HD
 114 – Hayatovci HD
 115 – Tropik TV HD
 116 – Kazbuka HD
 117 – Disney Channel
 118 – Disney Junior
 119 – Cartoon Network
 120 – Boomerang
 121 – Premier Liga HD
 122 – Arena Premium 1 HD
 123 – Arena Premium 2 HD
 124 – Arena Premium 3 HD
 125 – Arena Sport 1 HD
 126 – Arena Sport 2 HD
 127 – Arena Sport 3 HD
 128 – Arena Sport 4 HD
 129 – Arena Sport 5 HD
 130 – Arena Sport 6 HD
 131 – Arena Sport 1x2 HD
 132 – Arena Esport HD
 133 – Liverpool TV HD
 134 – Eurosport 1
 135 – Eurosport 2
 136 – Arena Fight HD
 137 – Extreme Sports Channel
 138 – KUVO TV HD
 139 – Moj Astrolog HD
 140 – HAYAT Folk HD
 141 – HAYAT Music HD
 142 – DM SAT
 143 – BN Music HD
 144 – Hype TV HD
 145 – Toxic TV HD
 146 – Toxic Rap HD
 147 – Toxic Folk HD
 148 – Pink Music
 149 – Pink Music 2
 150 – BMC TV HD
 151 – MTV Europe
 152 – Club MTV
 153 – MTV Hits
 154 – MTV Live HD
 155 – MTV 00s
 156 – MTV 90s
 157 – MTV 80s
 158 – Deutsche Welle TV HD
 159 – Fox News HD
 160 – Sky News
 161 – CNN International
 162 – France 24 HD
 163 – Espreso TV
 164 – RT
 165 – Russia-24
 166 – RTR-Planeta
 167 – TRT World HD
 168 – Al Jazeera English HD
 169 – RTL (German TV channel)
 170 – RTL Zwei
 171 – VOX
 172 – Fashion TV HD
 173 – Pink Ha Ha
 174 – Pink LOL
 175 – Pink Action HD
 176 – Pink Thriller
 177 – Pink Crime & Mystery
 178 – Pink Movies
 179 – Pink Romance
 180 – Pink Premium HD
 181 – Pink Sci Fi & Fantasy
 182 – Pink Film
 183 – Pink Family HD
 184 – Pink Comedy
 185 – Pink Reality
 186 – Pink HD
 187 – RED TV HD
 188 – Insta TV HD
 189 – VESTI HD
 190 – Pink M
 191 – Pink Kids
 192 – Pink Super Kids
 193 – Pink Style
 194 – Pink Show
 195 – Pink Soap
 196 – Pink World
 197 – Pink Zabava
 198 – City Play
 199 – Bravo Music
 200 – Pink Folk 2
 201 – Pink Hits
 202 – Pink Hits 2
 203 – Pink Pedia
 204 – Mozaik-Dokumentarni
 205 – Mozaik-Sport
 206 – Mozaik BH
 207 – Mozaik Regija
 208 – Mozaik Muzika
 209 – Mozaik Dječiji
 210 – Mozaik Filmski
 211 – Logosoft Info HD
 212 – Pink BH 1

Very Nice Paket
 1 – Eurosport 1 HD
 2 – Eurosport 2 HD
 3 – Fight Network HD
 4 – TnT Kids HD
 5 – AXN Spin
 6 – Pink World Cinema
 7 – Pink Serije
 8 – Pink Western
 9 – Pink Horor
 10 – Pink Classic
 11 – Discovery Science HD
 12 – ID HD
 13 – Crime + Investigation
 14 – History HD
 15 – History 2 HD
 16 – DTX HD
 17 – Food Network HD
 18 – Travel Channel HD
 19 – HGTV HD
 20 – Pink Fashion
 21 – Pink Kuvar
 22 – Pink Plus
 23 – Pink Folk 1
 24 – Pink Koncert
 25 – Pink & Roll
 26 – Pink Extra
 27 – Sevdah TV HD
 28 – Hustler HD
 29 – Playboy TV HD
 30 – Private TV HD
 31 – Dorcel TV HD
 32 – Pink Erotic 1
 33 – Pink Erotic 2
 34 – Pink Erotic 3
 35 – Pink Erotic 4
 36 – Pink Erotic 5
 37 – Pink Erotic 6
 38 – Pink Erotic 7
 39 – Pink Erotic 8

Great Paket
 1 – Eurosport 1 HD
 2 – Eurosport 2 HD
 3 – Fight Network HD
 4 – FightBox HD
 5 – Fast&Fun Box HD
 6 – Gametoon HD
 7 – TnT Kids HD
 8 – AXN Spin
 9 – Pink World Cinema
 10 – Pink Serije
 11 – Pink Western
 12 – Pink Horor
 13 – Pink Classic
 14 – Filmbox Arthouse
 15 – Filmbox Premium HD
 16 – Discovery Science HD
 17 – ID HD
 18 – Crime + Investigation
 19 – DocuBox HD
 20 – History HD
 21 – History 2 HD
 22 – DTX HD
 23 – Food Network HD
 24 – Travel Channel HD
 25 – HGTV HD
 26 – FashionBox
 27 – Pink Fashion
 28 – Pink Kuvar
 29 – Pink Plus
 30 – Pink Folk 1
 31 – Pink Koncert
 32 – Pink & Roll
 33 – Pink Extra
 34 – 360 TuneBox
 35 – Sevdah TV HD
 36 – Hustler HD
 37 – Playboy TV HD
 38 – Private TV HD
 39 – Dorcel TV HD
 40 – Erox
 41 – Eroxxx HD
 42 – Pink Erotic 1
 43 – Pink Erotic 2
 44 – Pink Erotic 3
 45 – Pink Erotic 4
 46 – Pink Erotic 5
 47 – Pink Erotic 6
 48 – Pink Erotic 7
 49 – Pink Erotic 8
 50 – HBO HD
 51 – HBO 2 HD
 52 – HBO 3 HD
 53 - HBO ON DEMAND HD
 54 - HBO MAX
 55 – Cinemax 1 HD
 56 – Cinemax 2 HD
 57 – Zadruga Live 1 HD
 58 – Zadruga Live 2 HD
 59 – Zadruga Live 3 HD
 60 – Zadruga Live 4 HD

FilmBox Paket
 1 – FightBox HD
 2 – Fast&Fun Box HD
 3 – Gametoon HD
 4 – Filmbox Arthouse
 5 – Filmbox Premium HD
 6 – DocuBox HD
 7 – FashionBox
 8 – 360 TuneBox
 9 – Erox
 10 – Eroxxx HD

Zadruga Paket
 1 – Zadruga Live 1 HD
 2 – Zadruga Live 2 HD
 3 – Zadruga Live 3 HD
 4 – Zadruga Live 4 HD

HBO HD Paket
 1 – HBO HD
 2 – HBO 2 HD
 3 – HBO 3 HD

Cinemax HD Paket
 1 – Cinemax 1 HD
 2 – Cinemax 2 HD

HBO Premium HD Paket
 1 – HBO HD
 2 – HBO 2 HD
 3 – HBO 3 HD
 4 - HBO ON DEMAND HD
 5 - HBO MAX
 6 – Cinemax 1 HD
 7 – Cinemax 2 HD

See also
 List of cable television companies in BiH
 List of radio stations in Bosnia and Herzegovina
 Television in Bosnia and Herzegovina

References

External links
 Logosoft
 M TEL – Telekom Srpske
 set iptv – Telekom Srpske

Cable television companies
Television in Bosnia and Herzegovina
Communications in Bosnia and Herzegovina